Janie Dee (born 20 June 1962) is an English actress and singer. She won the Olivier Award for Best Actress, Evening Standard Award and Critics' Circle Theatre Award for Best Actress in a Play, and in New York the Obie and Theatre World Award for Best Newcomer, for her performance as Jacie Triplethree in Alan Ayckbourn's Comic Potential.

She also won the Olivier Award for Best Supporting Performance in a Musical for her performance as Carrie Pipperidge in Nicholas Hytner's acclaimed production of Rodgers & Hammerstein's Carousel at the National Theatre.

In 2013, Dee won the TMA Theatre Award UK for Best Performance in a Musical for her performance as Dolly Levi in Hello Dolly at Curve, Leicester.

Early life and education
Janie Dee was born in Old Windsor, Berkshire. She is the daughter of John Lewis and Ruth Lewis (née Miller) and the eldest of four sisters. She trained at the Arts Educational School in Chiswick, London. On leaving ArtsEd, Dee began her career as a dancer, subsequently moving to Rome, Italy where she taught dance, took singing lessons, and learned to speak Italian.

Theatre

1986–2000

Dee's first West End production was Gillian Lynne's 1986 revival of Cabaret by Kander and Ebb in which she played Gertie and understudied the role of Sally Bowles. This led to an invitation from Wayne Sleep, who played the Emcee in that production, to join his UK tour as The Singer. Subsequently, the choreographer Bill Deamer invited her to the Salisbury Playhouse to perform in A Chorus of Disapproval by Alan Ayckbourn and as Jack in Jack and the Beanstalk at Christmas 1987.

This led to leading roles in musical theatre, including Sarah Brown in Guys and Dolls, Ellie May Chipley in the award-winning Royal Shakespeare Company and Opera North production of Show Boat at the London Palladium, Bombalurina in Andrew Lloyd Webber's Cats, Duke Ellington's Sophisticated Ladies, Claudine in Cole Porter's Can-Can, and Ado Annie in the national tour of Oklahoma!.

Dee's portrayal of Carrie Pipperidge in the 1993 Royal National Theatre's production of Carousel earned her an Olivier Award for Best Performance in a Supporting Role in a Musical and an invitation from Sir Richard Eyre to play her first major straight role; that of Julie in Johnny on a Spot at the National Theatre, where she subsequently went on to play Helen of Troy in The Women of Troy.

Dee has had an important working relationship with the playwright and director Alan Ayckbourn. This began with Paul Todd's fringe production of Between The Lines for which Ayckbourn wrote song lyrics and was followed by Dreams From A Summerhouse at the Stephen Joseph Theatre in Scarborough. She returned to work with Ayckbourn in 1996 in Neil Simon's They're Playing Our Song after which Ayckbourn wrote Comic Potential 'with Janie in mind'. Her performance as Jacie Triplethree at Scarborough, subsequently in the West End and then at the Manhattan Theatre Club in New York, won her the aforementioned Best Actress Awards in London and New York, as well as considerable critical acclaim. In New York Magazine, John Simon wrote "Miss Dee's creation is a spectacular achievement. I am not sure that I have ever seen its equal, but I am certain I have never seen, nor ever will see, it's superior."

2001–10

Dee is known for her versatility as a performer. She was invited by opera director David Pountney, to play Lidotchka in his production of Shostakovich's Paradise Moscow for Opera North. She followed this playing Masha in Brian Friel's translation of Chekhov's Three Sisters and Edyth Herbert, opposite Tim Flavin in the George Gershwin musical My One and Only, both at the Chichester Festival Theatre. My One and Only subsequently transferred to the West End and Dee was nominated for an Olivier Award for Best Actress in a Musical.

As a result, in 2003 Sir Peter Hall asked Dee to star in his season at the Theatre Royal, Bath, playing Gilda in Noël Coward's Design for Living and Emma in Harold Pinter's Betrayal, opposite Aden Gillett and Hugo Speer. Betrayal subsequently transferred to the Duchess Theatre in the West End. Hall then invited her to play Beatrice in his production of Much Ado About Nothing.

In 2005 Pinter invited Dee to play Kate in Old Times at the Gate Theatre, Dublin and to participate in a celebration of his work, including a reading of his play Celebration, with Jeremy Irons, Derek Jacobi, Sinéad Cusack, Penelope Wilton, Michael Gambon, Stephen Rea and Stephen Brennan. Producer, Michael Colgan, subsequently transferred the piece to London's Noël Coward Theatre, for 3 performances, with Charles Dance playing the Maitre D. Six months later Celebration was filmed for Channel 4, with Colin Firth playing the role of Russell, opposite Dee as Suki.

In 2006 Dee returned to musical theatre to play Mabel Normand in John Doyle's production of Jerry Herman's Mack and Mabel opposite David Soul at the Criterion Theatre, after which Dee took over the role of Lady Driver in Michael Frayn's Donkeys' Years at the Comedy Theatre. At the end of the run Dee helped to organise a reading for charity of William Nicholson's play Shadowlands which deals with the relationship between C. S. Lewis and the American writer Joy Gresham. Charles Dance played C.S. Lewis.

Sir Peter Hall, Harold Pinter and Dee were reunited for the National tour of Old Times with Susannah Harker and Neil Pearson and then a West End Production of Shadowlands was mounted in which Dee was reunited with director Michael Barker-Caven and Charles Dance. The production began at Wyndham's Theatre and subsequently transferred to the Novello Theatre. Charles Dance received the Critic's Circle Award for Best Actor for his portrayal of C. S. Lewis.

In 2008 Dee returned to the Open Air Theatre, Regent's Park to play Olivia in Twelfth Night opposite her Carousel co- star, Clive Rowe.

Alan Ayckbourn then invited Dee back to Scarborough to play the title role of Susan in a revival of his play Woman in Mind for which she won critical acclaim and the production subsequently transferred to the Vaudeville Theatre in London.

In 2009 Dee returned to Theatre Royal Bath to play Orinthia in George Bernard Shaw's The Apple Cart, directed by Sir Peter Hall,  and took over the role of Annie in Calendar Girls by Tim Firth in the West End. In 2010, Dee played The Countess of Roussillion in All's Well That Ends Well at Shakespeare's Globe which was filmed for DVD release by Opus Arte, Anna Leonowens in Rodgers and Hammerstein's The King and I at the Curve, Leicester, and played Natalya in Jonathan Kent's production of A Month in the Country at Chichester.

2011–2020
In 2011 she played Belinda in the Old Vic revival of Michael Frayn's Noises Off which was nominated for an Olivier Award for Best Revival and subsequently transferred to the Novello Theatre. In 2012, Dee was offered the role of women's magazine editor, Miranda in NSFW, a new play by Lucy Kirkwood at the Royal Court Theatre for which she was nominated for an Olivier Award for Best Actress in a Supporting Role.

At Christmas 2012 Dee played Dolly Levi in Paul Kerryson's revival of Hello Dolly! at the Curve, Leicester for which she won the TMA Theatre Award UK for Best Performance in a Musical.

In 2013 she appeared in the Stephen Sondheim revue, Putting It Together for four performances in Guildford, alongside David Bedella, Daniel Crossley, Damian Humbly and Caroline Sheen which subsequently transferred for a three-week run at the St James Theatre, London in January 2014.

From March until June 2014, Dee co-starred in the London revival of Noël Coward's Blithe Spirit at the Gielgud Theatre, opposite Dame Angela Lansbury, who reprised her 2009 Tony Award-winning Broadway performance as Madame Arcati. The London cast was Charles Edwards, Jemima Rooper, Serena Evans, Simon Jones and Patsy Ferran.

From September until December 2014, Dee played Titania/Hippolyta in Dominic Dromgoole's production of A Midsummer Night's Dream on a tour of Asia & Russia by Shakespeare's Globe. The production opened at the Rose Theatre, Kingston and then toured to Aylesbury Waterside Theatre before travelling to China, Taiwan, Russia, Singapore & Hong Kong. The cast included Aden Gillett as Oberon/Theseus and Trevor Fox as Bottom.

In January 2015 Dee starred as Desiree Armfeldt in a Gala Concert performance of Sondheim's A Little Night Music at London's Palace Theatre to mark the 40th anniversary of the original London production. The concert also starred Anne Reid, David Birrell, Joanna Riding, Jamie Parker, Anna O'Byrne, Fra Fee and Laura Pitt-Pulford. It was directed by Alastair Knights and the producer and musical director was Alex Parker. Later the same year she played Helene Hanff in a revival of 84, Charing Cross Road at Salisbury Playhouse, co-starring Clive Francis as Frank Doel and directed by James Roose-Evans. In April/May she starred in a revival of Eugene O'Neill's Ah, Wilderness! at the Young Vic. Whilst appearing in the O'Neill play, Dee also performed a special one-off show, Dream Queen in the Sam Wanamaker Playhouse at Shakespeare's Globe, as part of the London Festival of Cabaret. It drew on her experiences on the Globe tour of Asia and Russia and the inspiration of Elizabeth I and Shakespeare and she was joined by special guests, Juliet Stevenson and Kit Hesketh-Harvey and in the summer she played Irina Arkadina in Torben Betts' version of The Seagull, directed by Matthew Dunster at Regent's Park Open Air Theatre.

In 2016 she starred in the West End transfer of Tony-nominated Broadway comedy Hand to God at the Vaudeville Theatre in London, alongside Harry Melling, Neil Pearson, Jemima Rooper and Kevin Mains. The production was nominated for an Olivier Award in 2016 as Best New Comedy.

In April 2017 Dee completed a critically acclaimed run playing the title role in Linda by Penelope Skinner at Manhattan Theatre Club, New York City for which she was nominated for an Outer Critics Circle Award for Outstanding Actress in a Play and starred as Phyllis Rogers Stone in Stephen Sondheim and James Goldman's Follies at the National Theatre in London, opposite Imelda Staunton, Tracie Bennett and Philip Quast for which she was nominated for the Olivier Award for Best Actress in a Musical, the Evening Standard Award for Best Musical Performance, and the WhatOnStage Award for Best Actress in a Musical.

In 2018 she starred in Monogamy, a dark new comedy by Torben Betts, which plays at London's Park Theatre after a short UK tour, and appeared in Moonlight, directed by Lyndsey Turner and Night School, directed by Ed Stambollouian as part of the Jamie Lloyd Company's Pinter at the Pinter season. The following year Janie starred in the UK premiere of Christopher Durang's Tony Award-winning play Vanya and Sonia and Masha and Spike at Theatre Royal Bath, directed by Walter Bobbie which subsequently transferred to the Charing Cross Theatre in London. She played Fosca in Stephen Sondheim's musical Passion at the Cantiere Internazionale d'Arte di Montepulciano, Italy directed by Keith Warner and returned to London to star in Off-Broadway play The Niceties by Eleanor Burgess at the Finborough Theatre opposite Moronkẹ Akinola and directed by Matthew Iliffe, followed by a revival of Sandy Wilson's The Boy Friend at the Menier Chocolate Factory directed by Matthew White.

2021–present

In spring 2022, Janie starred opposite Griff Rhys Jones in An Hour And a Half Late at Theatre Royal Bath and on a UK tour. In May Janie, along with a host of West End stars, paid tribute to the late Stephen Sondheim in Stephen Sondheim's Old Friends A Celebration, staged by Matthew Bourne and Maria Friedman, with choreography by Stephen Mear, and produced by Cameron Mackintosh at the Sondheim Theatre. Further Sondheim tributes took place at Cadogan Hall, conceived and conducted by Alex Parker with his Luminaire Orchestra, at the Garrick Club, and the Victoria & Albert Museum, where Janie performed a cabaret as part of The Art of Making Art: Staging Sondheim.

Film and television
Dee has appeared in numerous TV dramas, including Love Hurts, The Bill, as Remy in 8 episodes of London's Burning, Heartbeat, House of Cards, Midsomer Murders, A Tribute to Harold Pinter, the South Bank Show with Sir Peter Hall and In Love With Shakespeare for Sky TV.

In 2003, Dee played Emma Lavenham opposite Martin Shaw's Adam Dalgliesh in two P.D. James adaptations for the BBC; Death in Holy Orders and The Murder Room.

In 2008 she played Zac Efron's mother, Mrs Samuels in Me and Orson Welles and in 2013 Dee filmed Dare To Be Wild, written and directed by Vivienne Decourcy in Dublin for Oasis Films and The Trouble With Dot And Harry, opposite Neil Morrissey directed by Sundance Festival Grand Prize-winner, Gary Walkow.

In January 2016, Dee appeared as Cara in comedy series Crashing written by and starring Phoebe Waller-Bridge and produced by Big Talk Productions for Channel 4 and in 2019 she appeared in the film Official Secrets with Keira Knightly and Matt Smith and the Channel Four adaptation of Lucy Kirkwood's Chimerica with Sophie Okonedo.

Dee's latest TV projects include Jamie Davis’ London-set three-part drama You & Me for ITV and ITVX, with Harry Lawtey, Jessica Barden and Sophia Brown, and The Burning Girls produced by Buccaneer Media for Paramount+, a 6-part adaptation of the novel by CJ Tudor, with Samantha Morton and Ruby Stokes.

Radio
Dee has recorded a number of musicals, concerts and dramas for radio, including Carousel and Finian's Rainbow for BBC Radio 2, and she has played Ian Fleming's Miss Moneypenny in radio dramatisations of the James Bond classics On Her Majesty's Secret Service, From Russia With Love, Dr No and Thunderball, as well as a role in Michael Frayn's Skios, all directed by Martin Jarvis.

In 2013 she was invited by composer Guy Barker to be the narrator in his new orchestral work That Obscure Hurt which was premiered at the Aldeburgh Festival 2013, as part of the Benjamin Britten centenary celebrations and was broadcast live on BBC Radio 3.

She has also appeared as a guest on the quiz show Quote... Unquote for BBC Radio 4.

Recordings
 Cabaret (1986 London Revival Cast, First Night Records OCRCD6010)
 Can Can (1988 London Revival Cast, Virgin CDV 2570)
 Salad Days (1994 Studio Cast, EMI Classics CDC 5 55200 2)
 The Shakespeare Revue (1998 Original London Cast, TER Records)
 Fred Astaire: His Daughter's Tribute (2001 London Cast Recording, First Night Records CASTCD81)
 Act One: Songs From The Musicals Of Alexander S. Bermange (2008 Dress Circle Records)
 Janie Dee at the BBC (2017 Auburn Jam Music)

Personal
Janie Dee is married to the actor and barrister Rupert Wickham and they have two children. Her sister-in-law is actress Saskia Wickham.

She is a member of the Board of Trustees of the Royal Theatrical Fund and supports a number of charities including Stop the War Coalition, St Mungos, Medecins Sans Frontieres and Amnesty International.

In March 2003, Dee devised and produced the London Concert For Peace, a charity concert celebrating the joy of life which was performed at the Theatre Royal, Drury Lane with a cast including Dame Judi Dench, Sir Ian McKellen and David Tennant. Proceeds from the concert were donated to Amnesty International, CARE, Oxfam and the Red Cross.

In June 2014, Dee organised a Noël Coward charity cabaret, entitled I Went to a Marvellous Party at London's historic Cafe de Paris, as a celebration of and farewell to Angela Lansbury, marking the end of the run of Blithe Spirit in London. The Blithe Spirit company performed songs by Noël Coward, a charity auction was hosted by Christopher Biggins and there were special guest appearances by Imelda Staunton and Barry Humphries. Proceeds from the event were donated to Asylum Link Merseyside, Combined Theatrical Charities, Masterclass, Mousetrap, the Noël Coward Foundation and the Royal Academy of Music.

In 2020, Dee organised the London Climate Change Festival. The Festival was organised to inspire, inform and bring hope around climate change. It brought together people from science, the arts, business and activism to discuss what can be done in regards to the climate crisis. The London Climate Change Festival was scheduled to commence on Monday 23 March. Due to COVID-19 Pandemic it took place online.

Work

Theatre

Musical theatre

Filmography

Radio

Awards and nominations

References

External links
 Official website
 
Janie Dee at IOBDB

English women singers
English musical theatre actresses
English stage actresses
English television actresses
Laurence Olivier Award winners
Royal Shakespeare Company members
British Shakespearean actresses
Living people
People educated at the Arts Educational Schools
English film actresses
Actresses from Berkshire
Theatre World Award winners
People from Old Windsor
20th-century English actresses
21st-century English actresses
Musicians from Berkshire
1962 births